is a Japanese football manager and former player who currently manages J3 League club YSCC Yokohama.

References

External links

Japanese footballers
J1 League players
Tokyo Verdy players
Japanese football managers
J3 League managers
YSCC Yokohama managers
Association football people from Tokyo
1976 births
Living people